A Man of No Importance is a 1994 comedy drama film written by Barry Devlin and directed by Suri Krishnamma, starring Albert Finney.

Plot summary
Alfred Byrne is a closeted homosexual bus conductor in 1963 Dublin. His sister tries to find him a suitable woman, but his real passion is putting on amateur theatre productions of Oscar Wilde plays, particularly Salome. The film deals with his struggle, temptation, and friendships, and how they are affected by his homosexuality.

Alfred is a bus conductor who recites poetry and Oscar Wilde play lines to his regular bus riders.  This year he hopes to put together the Wilde play Salome.  Alfie lives with his sister Lily.  He lines up the church hall only telling the priest that the play is about John the Baptist.  A new beautiful young rider, Adele Rice, is his perfect Salome.  Alfie lives above the Carson Butcher Shop and he slates up the butcher as King Herod.  He wants his bus driver Robbie to be John the Baptist, but Robbie refuses, saying he is no actor.  When the theatre group meets, Alfie tells them that they are not doing The Importance of Being Earnest this year but rather Salome.  Butcher Carson finds the play offensive and misses rehearsals.

Byrne goes ahead with his amateur production with his friend Birdy as stage manager and Mrs. Crowe for costumes and assumes all is going well. Alfie's sister sets up a dinner date and a trip to the zoo with his leading lady, Adele.  She tells Alfie she already had a boyfriend, John.  Widow Birdie tells Alfie of the joys and benefits of marriage.  An actor questions Alfie about his portrayal of Salome as a virgin princess.   Butcher Carson goes to church counsel and tries to stop the smut-filled play.

Alfie decides to give in to temptation and go to a gay bar.  He approaches a young good looking man called Kitty and asks for a cuddle.  They go outside and he is mugged and robbed.  His closeted homosexuality is exposed.  He suffers from fierce homophobia from his community, but he does get some support from actors in his play.

Cast

Reception
Rotten Tomatoes reported that 86% of the critics have given the film a positive review based on 14 reviews with an average rating of 6.96/10.

Year-end lists 
Dishonorable mention – Glenn Lovell, San Jose Mercury News

See also
A Man of No Importance, a musical based on this film.

References

External links
 
 
 

1994 films
1994 comedy-drama films
British LGBT-related films
Irish LGBT-related films
English-language Irish films
British independent films
Films directed by Suri Krishnamma
British comedy-drama films
Irish independent films
Films set in Dublin (city)
Films shot in Dublin (city)
1994 LGBT-related films
LGBT-related comedy-drama films
1994 independent films
1990s English-language films
Sony Pictures Classics films
1990s British films